Aleksandr Petrenko (born 8 February 1983) is a Russian triple jumper. His personal best jump is 17.43 metres, Kazan 2008.

International competitions

References

EAA profile

1983 births
Living people
Russian male triple jumpers
Olympic athletes of Russia
Athletes (track and field) at the 2008 Summer Olympics
Competitors at the 2005 Summer Universiade
World Athletics Championships athletes for Russia
Russian Athletics Championships winners